Blindbothel is a civil parish in the Borough of Allerdale in Cumbria, England.  It contains 31 listed buildings that are recorded in the National Heritage List for England.  Of these, two are listed at Grade I, the highest of the three grades, one is at Grade II*, the middle grade, and the others are at Grade II, the lowest grade.  The parish is almost completely rural.  It contains the village of Blindcrake, the hamlets of Redmain and Sunderland, and the scattered settlement of Isel.  Almost all the listed buildings are in or near these settlements, and most of them are houses and associated structures, or farmhouse and farm buildings.  The other listed buildings are a church, a table tomb in the churchyard, a bridge, a milestone, a watermill, and a covered well.

Key

Buildings

Notes and references

Notes

Citations

Sources

Lists of listed buildings in Cumbria